Ernesto Cortissoz International Airport is an international airport serving the area of Barranquilla, the capital city of the Atlántico department in Colombia. The airport is located in the suburban municipality of Soledad. It owes its name to one of the pioneers of Colombian aviation, Ernesto Cortissoz.

The airport serves as a focus city for Avianca, The flag carrier of Colombia. It is capable of accepting widebody aircraft such as the Boeing 747, Boeing 767, and Airbus A350. It is the most important airport in terms of infrastructure in the northern part of the country and the first in terms of cargo movements.

Description 
The airport is located in the municipality of Soledad,  from the center of Barranquilla. It is capable of receiving widebody aircraft such as the Boeing 747, McDonnell Douglas DC-10, and Airbus A350. In fact, it was once the largest airport in Colombia. Currently, the airport is fifth in number of passengers and cargo in the country. The airport has two terminals: the domestic terminal, with gates 6-13, and international, with gates 1-5 and 5A. In July 2007, the Aeronautica Civil gave the airport "open skies" designation, meaning that any airline in the world could fly to Barranquilla on any route with any frequency. This action was taken largely to promote tourism as Barranquilla is a key access point to the Caribbean.

History 
At the dawn of commercial aviation in Colombia, airport construction was delegated to airlines wishing to serve that particular city. Thus, the construction of major airports in Colombia mainly fell to SCADTA, among these being Soledad International Airport.

Soledad Airport soon became the main center of operations and maintenance of SCADTA for their domestic operations. International services were operated by Pan American Airways, which maintained scheduled DC-3 service, later supplemented by Boeing 307 Stratoliners, to Panama City, Kingston, and Miami. In 1946, international service at Soledad Airport resumed with Avianca DC-4s, first to Miami and later to Kingston and New York.

British South American Airways also began operating to Barranquilla 1946, using Lancastrians to provide a once-weekly flight to London via Bermuda. The service took 26 hours and was referred to as "The Lightning Route to Europe". Also that year, a number of special flights with DC-4 aircraft were operated from Barranquilla to Miami and New York under contract with the airline Transocean Airlines. KLM (Department of the West Indies) began operating in Barranquilla with DC-4 aircraft, giving passengers the opportunity to connect with scheduled flights to Curaçao, Netherlands Antilles, Jamaica, Haiti, Dominican Republic, Venezuela and Trinidad. In the early fifties LANSA inaugurated a service from Barranquilla to Havana, but never won permission to fly to Miami. However, in the sixties, TAXADER established a service to Miami, but only for a few months.

Soledad Airport soon established itself as the premier international airport in Colombia and the first hub in the country. In the mid-50s, Avianca built one of the most important aviation maintenance shops in Latin America at the airport, two large hangars that were built to house several aircraft at once. There were workshops for propellers, hydraulics, tools, electro-mechanical systems, and metal rolling. The maintenance facility also included a painting workshop, a warehouse of spare parts, and a technical school. The workshop was certified by the Civil Aeronautics Board (CAB) of the United States for the repair and overhaul of all types of domestic and foreign aircraft.

Also, in the early 1950s, a unique system was built for loading and unloading passengers and cargo from DC-4s that drastically reduced the time required by a claimed 50%.  With this system, the DC-4 taxied to where it was in a certain spot and then electric carts on rails that were flush with the runway surface moved the aircraft sideways to the unloading gangways.

With the opening of the El Dorado International Airport in Bogotá in December 1959, Soledad was relegated to secondary importance in the country. It was only upon the delivery of the first Boeing 727 to Avianca in 1966 that the runway was extended. However, in order to appropriately handle modern jet airliners, and the resulting increase in passenger traffic, there became a need to build a new international airport with a more modern terminal, more stands, and larger runways and taxiways. There was hope that this project would put Barranquilla back on the map as an airport served by major international carriers.

Finally, on the afternoon of April 7, 1981, Julio Cesar Turbay, president of the Republic, and Alvaro Uribe Velez, Chief of the Aeronáutica Civil dedicated Barranquilla's new international airport Ernesto Cortissoz. The new terminal, with an area of 35,000 square meters, along with its new control tower, apron, taxiways, and runway (now 3,000 meters long by 45m wide), were built north of the old Soledad Airport. The design was by architect Aníbal González Moreno-Ripoll and the new terminal was built by the firm Paredes, Fuentes, y Vasquez Ltda. The new terminal had seven domestic gates and four international gates each with its own waiting area. The premises of the former terminal building became the cargo area.

Formerly, the company Caribbean Airports S. A. "ACSA" was the operator of airport concession. ACSA was incorporated in the month of December 1996 and its main activity is the administration and economic exploitation of Ernesto Cortissoz International Airport. This status was granted by the State through the renewable concession contract, number 001-CON-97, concluded with the Special Administrative Unit of Civil Aeronautics for a term of 15 years. Under this contract, ACSA assumed operations on March 1, 1997. According to the contract award, administration and economic exploitation include the provision of all airport services, maintenance, and management of the terminal, runway, ramp, airport facilities, visual aids for approach and access roads. Aeronáutica Civil reserved management and responsibility for control and monitoring functions of en-route air traffic and the proper functioning of air navigation aids, including approach, communications, and other equipment intended and necessary for the proper air traffic control.

Ernesto Cortissoz International Airport is named after one of the most important Colombian aviation pioneers. Ernesto Cortissoz Alvarez-Correa was an entrepreneur, born in Barranquilla, which along with four Colombians and three Germans founded SCADTA in December 1919. On June 8, 1924, while traveling in the Junkers F.13 "Tolima" together with other executives of the company, he died as a result of one of the first plane crashes in the country.

Physical characteristics

Field 
The runway is made of asphalt and has a length of 3,000 m (9,842 ft) and a width of 45 m (148 ft). The approaches to both ends of the runway are categorized for instrument flight operations in precision category I.

The airport has a taxiway parallel to the runway in order to reach both ends. The three turn-offs near the center of the runway connect with the taxiway and the ramp; they are 22.5 m wide and are made of concrete.

Ramps 
The airport has three ramps for parking aircraft, they are for use by commercial passenger aircraft, cargo aircraft and military aircraft. The ramp for commercial passenger aircraft is located opposite the passenger terminal building and has 16 parking spaces. The Cargo ramp is located north of the passenger terminal, near the head of runway 23.

Passenger terminal 
The airport terminal is currently undergoing renovations. Renovations were to be complete somewhere around the first quarter of 2020, but due to the COVID-19 pandemic, it has been moved. The airport has one passenger terminal building to handle all of the airport's commercial traffic. There are 36 check posts, a series of shops, including a Duty-free shop, and passenger cafes and restaurants. There are two restricted areas for passengers, depending on the destination of the flight (domestic or international). On the side for domestic flights are located the gates 6, 7, 8, 9, 10, 11, 12, and 13, each with a waiting area for passengers. For access to aircraft, four gates (6, 7, 8, and 9) have boarding bridges, each with two degrees of freedom, while aircraft at gates 10, 11, 12, and 13 are accessed by walking onto the ramp.

In the international area are gates 1, 2, 3, 4, and 5, each with a waiting area for passengers. Aircraft are accessed via jet bridges at all gates except for gate 1. The bridges at gates 2, 3, 4, and 5 have three degrees of freedom. Passengers claim their luggage in a room used for that purpose on the first level, it has two conveyor belts. International passengers receive their luggage in this same room after passing through the immigration area. After leaving the terminal building you can access the public area which houses the offices of rental car companies and the taxi waiting area.

Cargo terminal 
The cargo terminal is the former passenger terminal building, located northeast of the passenger terminal and with an area of 9,000 m2. The loading dock can accommodate up to two aircraft simultaneously. Current use of the cargo terminal does not exceed 30% capacity.

Airlines and destinations

Passenger

Cargo

Incidents 
 On March 17, 1995, an Intercontinental DC-9 was destroyed by fire while it was parked in the apron, no one was on the plane.
 On November 19, 2006, a DC-10 operated by Cielos Airlines overran the runway while landing in bad weather, All 6 crew were injured.
 On November 21, 2006, Avianca Flight 9522, which was outbound from Bogotá, also overran the runway. All 135 people survived.
 On August 23, 2008, Aires Flight 0051 was outbound from Curaçao overran the runway because a problem with a landing gear. All 25 people survived.

References

External links 
 
 Aeropuerto Internacional Ernesto Cortissoz, official web site
 
 

Airports in Colombia
Buildings and structures in Atlántico Department